Man of the Year is a 2006 American political satire film directed and written by Barry Levinson, produced by James G. Robinson, and starring Robin Williams. The film also features Christopher Walken, Laura Linney, Lewis Black, and Jeff Goldblum. In the film Williams portrays Tom Dobbs, the host of a comedy/political talk show, based loosely on the real-life persona of Jon Stewart. With an offhand remark, he prompts four million people to e-mail their support; then he decides to campaign for President. The film was released theatrically on October 13, 2006, and was filmed in Toronto and Hamilton, Ontario, and in parts of Washington, D.C. Man of the Year received mostly negative reviews and earned $41.2 million on a $20 million budget.

Plot
Tom Dobbs is host of a satirical news program, tapping into public frustrations with divisive, special interest-driven politics. Dobbs laughs off an audience suggestion that he run for president, but following online support, he announces his campaign on air. He gets on the ballot in 13 states and participates in a national debate with the Democratic incumbent, President Kellogg, and Republican candidate Senator Mills.

Eleanor Green works at the Delacroy voting machine company, which will provide machines for the Presidential election. Shortly before the elections, Eleanor notices that the voting system does not work correctly and alerts the head of the company, James Hemmings, via an e-mail that he deletes.

Dobbs takes the campaign a bit too seriously, to the chagrin of his manager, Jack Menken, and his show's producer, Eddie Langston. The night of the presidential debates, fed up with the other candidates' posturing, Dobbs shifts back into comedy, keeping the audience laughing while making serious points. He continues his showman persona on the campaign trail, shaking up the political landscape and surging in the polls, but remains well behind Kellogg and Mills.

On Election Day, early returns show Kellogg beating Mills everywhere, exactly as Eleanor predicted the voting system would report. Dobbs sweeps the 13 states in which he is on the ballot, taking enough electoral votes to be elected president. When Eleanor confronts Hemmings about the Delacroy computer error, senior executive Stewart turns her aside. While Dobbs and his team move from shock to celebration, Eleanor is attacked in her home and given an injection. The next day, she displays erratic behavior and is sent to the hospital, where tests reveal high levels of illegal drugs. Her workmate Danny visits and reveals he has been promoted, which she thinks is an effort to buy him off. He tries to convince her that she has a drug habit and that no one will listen if she goes public, but she decides that Dobbs will believe her.

Traveling to Washington and impersonating an FBI agent, Eleanor explains to Dobbs that she was recently fired by Delacroy, but he is pulled away before she can explain the election results. Dobbs tries to contact Eleanor by calling Delacroy's headquarters, and Hemmings explains Eleanor was fired due to a drug problem.

Eleanor figures out the flaw in Delacroy's system – no matter the actual results, the system declares the winner as the name with double letters, in alphabetical order, so that Do’’bb’’s beats Kello’’gg’’, which beats Mi’’ll’’s. Eleanor calls Dobbs and he whisks her off to a Thanksgiving celebration with his friends. Smitten with her, he says he already knows about her drug problem, which she denies and tells him that the election result was wrong before leaving. Dobbs calls Eleanor, telling her that he will break the news the next day. She calls Danny, who informs Stewart, who preempts Dobbs' public announcement by announcing that Eleanor was caught attempting to manipulate the election for Dobbs but that her efforts had no impact on the polls. Dobbs' team turns against Eleanor, except for Dobbs. Eleanor becomes increasingly concerned for her safety, and sees Delacroy agents break into her motel room and take her computer.

She flees to a crowded mall, but is followed and apprehended by a Delacroy agent. She escapes and calls Dobbs from a pay phone, but another Delacroy agent drives his truck into the phone booth. Dobbs goes to the scene and talks with the injured Eleanor in her ambulance, where she convinces him of the truth.

Dobbs’ friends encourage him to remain president, with polls showing that 60% of the nation wants him in office. That night, invited onto the Weekend Update segment of Saturday Night Live, Dobbs announces that the Delacroy vote system was flawed, that Eleanor told her bosses but they covered it up and silenced her, and that he will not run in the new election that must now take place.

President Kellogg wins a second term, Dobbs returns to hosting his satirical news program, with Eleanor as his producer and later his wife, and the Delacroy executives are arrested. TIME magazine chooses Dobbs as Person of the Year.

Cast

 Robin Williams as Tom Dobbs
 Christopher Walken as Jack Menken
 Laura Linney as Eleanor Green
 Lewis Black as Eddie Langston
 Jeff Goldblum as Stewart
 David Alpay as Danny
 Rick Roberts as James Hemmings
 Karen Hines as Alison McAndrews
 Linda Kash as Jenny Adams
 David Nichols as President Kellogg
 David Ferry as Senator Mills
 Jacqueline Pillon as Security Tech

Tina Fey and Amy Poehler make cameo appearances as themselves as part of the Weekend Update skit on Saturday Night Live.

Production

Casting
Director Barry Levinson originally wanted Howard Stern for the starring role of Tom Dobbs, which would have been his second movie role after starring as himself in Private Parts. Scheduling conflicts with Stern's debut on Sirius radio prevented him from taking on the part.

Release
Universal Pictures released Man of the Year theatrically on October 13, 2006.  It grossed $37.3 million in North America and $3.9 million in other territories for a total worldwide gross of $41.2 million.  Universal Pictures Home Entertainment released it on DVD on February 20, 2007, where it grossed another $25.1 million in sales. Sony Pictures Home Entertainment released it on Blu-ray on November 3, 2020.

Reception
Man of the Year received mostly negative reviews. On Rotten Tomatoes it has an approval rating of 21% based on reviews from 147 critics, with an average rating of 4.40/10. The site's consensus states: "Weakened by second-half attempts at thriller and romance, this presidential comedy also fails to hit any sharp political notes, resulting in a confused and unsatisfying mess." On Metacritic the film has a score of 39% based on reviews from 30 critics.

Stephanie Zacharek of Salon.com wrote, "It's a comedy, a political thriller, a love story: Barry Levinson's Man of the Year tries to be all things to all people and fails on every count – a little like the generic, ineffectual politicians it's pretending to excoriate". James Berardinelli of ReelViews felt it "makes telling points and has a lot to say, but it loses its voice along with its consistency around the mid-way point". Josh Larsen of the Sun Publications line of newspapers asked straight out, "What is it about Robin Williams that he often appears in these wild misfires, pictures that are so full of promise yet so disastrous in execution?" Frank Lovece of Film Journal International placed the well-regarded Levinson's challenge and failure within a larger context: "If satire is what dies on a Saturday night, then political-satire movies are what die on Fridays. Maybe we're used to the TV topicality of The Daily Show with Jon Stewart or Real Time with Bill Maher, whereas movies are months in the making, turning their current events into history. Yet successful satire needn't be topical – witness Network, Election, Dr. Strangelove – because some verities are timeless. Since when, after all, hasn't there been a populist saying, 'Throw the rascals out'?"

The film debuted at #3 at the box office its opening weekend, with a theatrical gross of $12,550,000.

The film would later be seen as prescient, with the election of TV comedians to the presidency of both Guatemala (Jimmy Morales in 2017) and Ukraine (Volodymyr Zelensky in 2019).

See also
 Pat Paulsen, comedian who ran for President.
 Vermin Supreme, comedian and perennial candidate. 
 Donald Trump, television personality who became President of the United States.
 Stephen Colbert presidential campaign, 2008

References

External links

  (archived)
 
 
 

2000s comedy thriller films
2000s English-language films
2000s political comedy-drama films
2006 comedy-drama films
2006 films
2006 romantic comedy-drama films
American comedy thriller films
American political comedy-drama films
American political satire films
American romantic comedy-drama films
Films about fictional presidents of the United States
Films about presidential elections
Films directed by Barry Levinson
Films scored by Graeme Revell
Films set in the White House
Films shot in Hamilton, Ontario
Films shot in Toronto
Morgan Creek Productions films
United States presidential succession in fiction
Universal Pictures films
2000s American films